"Another Hero Lost" is the second single from the album Threads of Life by the thrash metal band Shadows Fall. Unlike most other Shadows Fall songs, it is a soft ballad. It was written about singer Brian Fair's cousin, who died in the U.S. war in Iraq. During concerts the band dedicates the song to soldiers fighting, and ones who have died in Iraq. The song reached #40 on the Mainstream Rock Chart. On November 17, the video debuted on MTV's Headbangers Ball and MTV2.

Track listing

Chart performance
The song peaked at 40 in the Hot Mainstream Rock Tracks chart.

References

2007 singles
2007 songs
Atlantic Records singles
Shadows Fall songs
Heavy metal ballads
Commemoration songs
Song recordings produced by Nick Raskulinecz